Mallawi (  ; Saidi pronunciation:) is a city in Egypt, located in the governorate of Minya.

Overview 

Situated in a farm area, the town produces textiles and handicrafts.

The southern limit is Allah Mansion (possibly a religious structure?), the northern limit is a television transmitter, the eastern border is the Nile, and the western boundary is Dirotiah Lake.
The city contains many ancient Egyptian artifacts.

The name of the city is derived from Coptic and literally means "the place of textile" (ⲙⲁⲛ – "place of", ⲗⲁⲩ – "textile").

Climate 
Köppen-Geiger climate classification system classifies its climate as hot desert (BWh), as the rest of Egypt.

See also
 List of cities and towns in Egypt
 Mallawi Museum
 Monastery of Saint Fana

References

External links 

 The Coptic Orthodox Diocese of Mallawi
 Visits of the Holy Family: Mallawi, Egypt

Populated places in Minya Governorate
Cities in Egypt